Viktor Ivanovich Mazin (18 June 1954 – 8 January 2022) was a Soviet featherweight weightlifter. He won a gold medal at the 1980 Olympics in Moscow, setting five ratified world records in the process. Domestically, Mazin won one Soviet title in 1980, and placed second in 1979 and 1981. He retired in 1982 after winning a Soviet Cup. He died in Minusinsk on 8 January 2022, at the age of 67.

References

1954 births
2022 deaths
Kazakhstani male weightlifters
Soviet male weightlifters
Olympic weightlifters of the Soviet Union
Weightlifters at the 1980 Summer Olympics
Olympic gold medalists for the Soviet Union
Olympic medalists in weightlifting
Medalists at the 1980 Summer Olympics
People from Zabaykalsky Krai